Vicky Dombroski is a former coach of the New Zealand women's national rugby union team. She was also a selector and manager of the team. To date, she is the only woman to have coached the Black Ferns. She played for Taranaki.

In the late 1980s, the women's rugby movement was emerging but recognition and assistance from the New Zealand Rugby Football Union wasn't available. In frustration, Dombroski wrote a letter to the NZRFU in 1988 requesting permission to have a club competition in Taranaki. She received a letter from former All Blacks coach, John Stewart on behalf of the NZRFU stating that they were in favour of women taking an active role in the game.

Dombroski could have attended the 1991 Women's Rugby World Cup, but could not raise the needed $5000. Her national involvement has been as selector (1992–1997), coach (1994–1995) and manager (1998–2000).

References 

Living people
New Zealand rugby union coaches
Year of birth missing (living people)
New Zealand women's national rugby union team coaches